

References 
Population Distribution by Sex, State, LGAs and Senatorial Districts: 2006 Census Priority Tables Vol.3, National Population commission Nigeria, published April 2010, retrieved 24 June 2013

 
Nigeria geography-related lists
Lists by area